The Zhenge Daidan Memorial Park is a memorial park in Nangan Township, Lienchiang County, Taiwan.

Architecture
The memorial park features a big wall with the writing Sleeping on Spears, Awaiting the Dawn. The wall forms a 4-story narrow building stands inside a park. The inscription was written by President Chiang Kai-shek during his visit in 1958 to encourage the armed forces to retake back the mainland. The memorial park is located on top of a hill which is connected by a series of steps.

References

Buildings and structures in Lienchiang County
Memorial parks in Taiwan
Tourist attractions in Lienchiang County